The individual show jumping in equestrian at the 1972 Summer Olympics in Munich was held at Olympic Stadium on 3 September. It was open to men and women. There were 54 competitors from 21 nations, with two additional non-starters. The event was won by Graziano Mancinelli of Italy, the nation's first victory in individual jumping since 1960 and third overall, tying France for most of all nations. Great Britain extended its podium streak in the event to four Games (no other nation had managed more than two) with Ann Moore's silver. The United States reach the podium for a second straight Games as Neal Shapiro took bronze.

Background

This was the 14th appearance of the event, which had first been held at the 1900 Summer Olympics and has been held at every Summer Olympics at which equestrian sports have been featured (that is, excluding 1896, 1904, and 1908). It is the oldest event on the current programme, the only one that was held in 1900. The team and individual events remained separated, as they had been starting in 1968.

Four of the top 10 riders from the 1968 competition returned: gold medalist William Steinkraus of the United States, two-time (1960 and 1968) bronze medalist David Broome of Great Britain, sixth-place finisher Jim Elder of Canada, and seventh-place finisher Piero D'Inzeo of Italy. Also returning was D'Inzeo's brother Raimondo D'Inzeo. Raimondo had won the 1960 gold and 1956 silver medals; Piero had won the 1960 silver and 1956 bronze medals. The brothers were competing in their seventh Olympics; they would be the first to reach eight Games. Broome was the reigning (1970) World Champion. 

For only the second time, no nations made their debut in the event. France competed for the 13th time, most of any nation, having missed the individual jumping only in 1932.

Competition format

The competition used the two-round format introduced in 1952, with the elimination feature added in 1968. The top 20 riders from the first round qualified for the second round, both rounds were then combined to determine placement, if tied a jump-off between all tied riders would determine the winners.

The first round was held on a course 760 metres long with 14 obstacles (17 total jumps), including a 5 metres water jump and five oxers. The second round course was shorter, at 660 metres and 10 obstacles (13 jumps).

Schedule

All times are Central European Time (UTC+1)

Results

References

External links
Official report

Equestrian at the 1972 Summer Olympics